General Sir Frederick Charles Arthur Stephenson,  (17 July 1821 – 10 March 1911) was a senior British Army officer who served as Major General commanding the Brigade of Guards and General Officer Commanding the Home District from 1876 to 1879.

Military career
The second son of Major-General Sir Benjamin C. Stephenson, Stephenson was commissioned into the Scots Guards in 1837. He fought in the Crimean War and took part in the expeditions to China in 1858 and 1860 during the Second Opium War.

He was appointed acting Inspector-General of the Auxiliary Forces in 1873 and made Major General commanding the Brigade of Guards and General Officer Commanding the Home District in 1876.

He became Commander-in-Chief of the British Army of Occupation in Cairo in 1883 during the Mahdist War. He also led the Frontier Force and defeated the Dervish Army at the Battle of Ginnis in Sudan in 1885.

In retirement he was Constable of the Tower from 1898 to 1911.

References

 

|-

|-

|-

 

1821 births
1911 deaths
British Army generals
Knights Grand Cross of the Order of the Bath
Scots Guards officers
British Army personnel of the Crimean War
British Army personnel of the Second Opium War
British Army personnel of the Mahdist War
Coldstream Guards officers
Constables of the Tower of London